The Flensburg-Engelsby transmitting station is an FM radio and digital television transmission facility owned by Norddeutscher Rundfunk and sited near the town of Flensburg in Schleswig-Holstein, Germany.

The following services are radiated from its 215-metre-high guyed grounded lattice steel mast:

FM radio

Digital terrestrial television

History
It was one of the few functioning transmitters of Germany at the end of World War II.

In 1948 this facility transferred to NWDR, the predecessor of today's NDR. As there was not enough space for expansion at Jürgensby, the site was given up in 1957 and the wood tower was dismantled.

Norddeutscher Rundfunk
Radio masts and towers in Germany